The Milanka Price Index was one of the principal stock indices of the Colombo Stock Exchange in Sri Lanka till it was discontinued in January 2013 further to introduction of Standard & Poor's Sri Lanka 20 index.  It was composed of a select group of 25 best performing stocks, a list which was reviewed each quarter, as opposed to the Colombo Stock Exchange's "All Share Price Index", which uses all of the ~250 stocks on the exchange to calculate an index value.

Listings 
As of January 2012, the 25 stocks on the Milanka Price Index, listed  by sector, are as follows:

Banks, Finance & Insurance sector

Beverage, Food & Tobacco sector

Diversified sector

Manufacturing sector

Power & Energy

Healthcare sector

Land & Property sector

Investment Trusts

Trading

See also 
List of South Asian stock exchanges

References

External links 
Colombo Stock Exchange
Colombo Stock Watch - One click access to information on shares 

Economy of Sri Lanka
Economy of Colombo
Asian stock market indices